Althenia preissii is a plant found in fresh to brackish waters in Australia. This species has been transferred from the genus Lepilaena.

References

External links
Flora of Western Australia

Potamogetonaceae
Taxa named by Johann Georg Christian Lehmann